The Cebu Provincial Board is the Sangguniang Panlalawigan (provincial legislature) of the Philippine province of Cebu.

The members are elected via plurality-at-large voting: the province is divided into seven districts, two representatives in each district. The candidates with the highest number of votes in each district, depending on the number of members the district sends, are elected. The vice governor is the ex officio presiding officer, and only votes to break ties. The vice governor is elected via the plurality voting system province-wide.

The districts used in appropriation of members is coextensive with the legislative districts of Cebu.

Aside from the regular members, the board also includes the provincial federation presidents of the Liga ng mga Barangay (ABC, from its old name "Association of Barangay Captains"), the Sangguniang Kabataan (SK, youth councils) and the Philippine Councilors League (PCL).

District apportionment

List of members

Current members 
 Vice Governor: Hilario P. Davide III (Liberal Party)

Past members 
An additional three ex officio members are the presidents of the provincial chapters of the Association of Barangay Captains, the Councilors' League, the Sangguniang Kabataan provincial president; the municipal and city (if applicable) presidents of the Association of Barangay Captains, Councilor's League and Sangguniang Kabataan, shall elect amongst themselves their provincial presidents which shall be their representatives at the board.

Vice Governor

1st District 
City: Carcar, Naga, Talisay
Municipalities: Minglanilla, San Fernando, Sibonga
Population (2015):  709,660

2nd District 
Municipalities: Alcoy, Argao, Boljoon, Dalaguete, Oslob, Samboan, Santander
Population (2015):  239,820

3rd District 
City: Toledo
Municipalities: Aloguinsan, Asturias, Balamban, Barili, Pinamungajan, Tuburan
Population (2015):  541,152

4th District 
City: Bogo
Municipalities: Bantayan, Daanbantayan, Madridejos, Medellin, San Remigio, Santa Fe, Tabogon, Tabuelan
Population (2015):  484,198

5th District 
City: Danao
Municipalities: Borbon, Carmen, Catmon, Compostela, Liloan, Pilar, Poro, San Francisco, Sogod, Tudela
Population (2015):  558,548

6th District 
City: Mandaue
Municipalities: Consolacion, Cordova
Population (2015):  553,894

7th District 
Municipalities: Alcantara, Alegria, Badian, Dumanjug, Ginatilan, Malabuyoc, Moalboal, Ronda
Population (2015): 214,364

Association of Barangay Captains President

Philippine Councilors League President

Sangguniang Kabataan Federation President

Notes

References 

Provincial boards in the Philippines